Francesc Areny Casal is an Andorran politician. He was General Syndic (President) of the General Council of Andorra between 1997 and 2005.

References

General Syndics of the General Council (Andorra)
Living people
Year of birth missing (living people)
Place of birth missing (living people)